Richard Hale (born James Richards Hale; November 16, 1892 – May 18, 1981) was an American opera and concert singer and later a character actor of film, stage and television.  Hale's appearance usually landed him roles as either Middle Eastern or Native American characters.

Life and career 
Born in Rogersville, Tennessee, Hale attended Columbia University on a singing scholarship.  Upon graduation in 1914, he turned down an offer to join Columbia's English department, choosing instead to join Minnie Maddern Fiske's theater group. Hale's 1921 debut at Aeolian Hall began a successful career in opera as a baritone; he toured Europe and the United States.  The 1927 New York Times film review of The Unknown credits "Richard Hale, baritone" as singing "The Pirate's Frolic". During the 1930s, Hale performed at the Berkshire Playhouse in Stockbridge, Massachusetts. Hale also narrated Peter and the Wolf for Sergei Prokofiev, at Tanglewood, with Serge Koussevitsky conducting. Hale was also the narrator for Arthur Fiedler's 1953 RCA recording of the same music with the Boston Pops.

In later life, he turned more and more to acting. His most notable role was in the 1956 film Friendly Persuasion, starring Gary Cooper. He was also notable as the Soothsayer who warns "Beware the Ides of March!" in the Shakespeare film Julius Caesar (1953). In All the King's Men his character's name was Richard Hale. Hale also appeared in To Kill a Mockingbird (1962) as the sinister neighbour Nathan Radley. He was also known for his portrayal of Father Manuel Ferreira in The Miracle of Our Lady of Fatima. He made four guest appearances on Perry Mason, including murder victim George Lutts in 1957 in the show's third episode, "The Case of the Nervous Accomplice," and general store owner Robert Tepper in the 1960 episode, "The Case of the Violent Village." He also appeared in television programs such as Maverick (as Judge Hookstratten in the episode "Bolt from the Blue" written and directed by Robert Altman and starring Roger Moore in which the "hanging judge" sings a mournful ballad near the opening and again at the closing of the episode), Cheyenne, Rawhide, Daniel Boone, Green Acres, Petticoat Junction, Bonanza, Gunsmoke, The Wild Wild West (as Sedgewick in the fourth-season episode "The Night of the Sedgewick Curse"), Star Trek (as Goro in the third-season episode "The Paradise Syndrome"), Harry O (as Jud Kane in the second-season episode "Victim"), Adam-12, Here Come the Brides (as Old Indian in the second-season episode "The Last Winter"), and as Uncle Gilbert on an episode of The Munsters.

His death, aged 88, was due to problems relating to cardiovascular disease.

Partial filmography

 None Shall Escape (1944) – Rabbi David Levin
 Knickerbocker Holiday (1944) – Tammany
 The Girl in the Case (1944) – John Heyser
 Counter-Attack (1945) – Gen. Kalinev (uncredited)
 A Thousand and One Nights (1945) – Kofir
 Abilene Town (1946) – Charlie Fair
 Badman's Territory (1946) – Ben Wade
 The Devil's Mask (1946) – Curator Raymond Halliday (uncredited)
 The Man Who Dared (1946) – Reginald Fogg
 The Other Love (1947) – Professor Linnaker
 Queen Esther (1948) – Mordecai
 Port Said (1948) – Mario Giustano
 Life of St. Paul Series (1949) – Sergius Paulus
 The Beautiful Blonde from Bashful Bend (1949) – Mr. Gus Basserman (uncredited)
 All the King's Men (1949) – Himself (uncredited)
 The Pilgrimage Play (1949) – Pontius Pilate
 Convicted (1950) – Judge (uncredited)
 The Desert Hawk (1950) – Imam – the Holy One (uncredited)
 Kim (1950) – Hassan Bey
 Inside Straight (1951) – Mr. Deering (uncredited)
 Soldiers Three (1951) – Govind-Lal
 Night Into Morning (1951) – Judge (uncredited)
 The Law and the Lady (1951) – Sheriff (uncredited)
 Angels in the Outfield (1951) – Dr. Blane, Psychiatrist (uncredited)
 The Unknown Man (1951) – Cocktail Party Guest (uncredited)
 The Man with a Cloak (1951) – Durand
 Flame of Araby (1951) – King Chandra (uncredited)
 Young Man with Ideas (1952) – Vishto (uncredited)
 Scaramouche (1952) – Perigore
 When in Rome (1952) – Professor Homer Sandway (uncredited)
 The Miracle of Our Lady of Fatima (1952) – Father Ferreira
 Caribbean (1952) – Ship's Doctor (uncredited)
 Springfield Rifle (1952) – Gen. Halleck (uncredited)
 Rogue's March (1953) – Igor – Russian Emissary
 San Antone (1953) – Abraham Lincoln 
 Julius Caesar (1953) – Soothsayer
 The Vanquished (1953) – Colonel (uncredited)
 Sea of Lost Ships (1953) – Captain Welch
 The Diamond Queen (1953) – Gabriel Tavernier
 Red Garters (1954) – Dr. J. Pott Troy
 Passion (1954) – Don Domingo (uncredited)
 Drum Beat (1954) – General Sherman (uncredited)
 Jupiter's Darling (1955) – Auctioneer (uncredited)
 Canyon Crossroads (1955) – Joe Rivers
 Moonfleet (1955) – Starkill
 A Man Alone (1955) – Judge Witham (uncredited)
 Pillars of the Sky (1956) – Isaiah
 Friendly Persuasion (1956) – Purdy
 Short Cut to Hell (1957) – AT
 Voice in the Mirror (1958) – Gaunt Man (uncredited)
 Ben-Hur (1959) – Gaspar (uncredited) 
 Sergeants 3 (1962) – White Eagle
 Tower of London (1962) – Tyrus
 To Kill a Mockingbird (1962) – Nathan Radley
 Good Neighbor Sam (1964) – Mr. Bernier (uncredited)
 Scandalous John (1971) – Old Indian
 The Limit (1972) – Man in Park
 One Little Indian (1973) – Old Indian
 Rafferty and the Gold Dust Twins (1975) – Reverend Culpepper – The Jesus Freak
 Escape to Witch Mountain (1975) – Bolt's Servant (uncredited)
 Family Plot (1976) – A.A. Adamson (uncredited)
 Evil Town (1977) – Lester Wylie

References

External links

Richard Hale at AllMusic

1892 births
1981 deaths
20th-century American male actors
American male film actors
American male stage actors
American male television actors
20th-century American male opera singers
People from Rogersville, Tennessee